Donald Reid may refer to:

Donald Reid (politician born 1833) (1833–1919), New Zealand politician, represented Taieri electorate 1866–69 and 1871–78
Donald Reid (politician born 1850) (1850–1922), New Zealand politician, represented Bruce electorate 1885–87
Donald Reid (politician born 1855) (1855–1920), New Zealand politician, represented Taieri electorate 1902–08
Donald Bartlett Reid (1926–2001), mayor of Ottawa, Canada
Donald Lees Reid (born 1951), Scottish author
Don Reid (singer) (born 1945), lead vocalist and songwriter of The Statler Brothers
Don Reid (basketball) (born 1973), American basketball player
 Don Reid, playwright, Codgers

See also
Donald Reid Medal, named after the British epidemiologist Donald Reid (died 1977)
Donald Reid Cabral (1923–2006), Dominican military commander and Triumvirate leader
Donald Reed (disambiguation)
Donal Reid (born early 1960s), Gaelic footballer
Don Read (born 1933), football coach
J. Don Read (born 1943), Canadian psychologist
Donna Reed (1921–1986), American actress